Liang Wang may refer to:

Chinese royalty
In Chinese history, Liang Wang (Prince/King of Liang) may refer to:

Warring States period
Monarchs of Wei (state), also known as Liang after 334 BC
King Hui of Wei (died 319 BC), also known as King Hui of Liang

Han dynasty and Shu Han
Peng Yue (died 196BC), King of Liang during the Qin–Han transition, created 203BC
Liu Wu, Prince of Liang (died 144BC)
Liu Mai (died 137BC)
Liu Xiang, Prince of Liang (died 97BC)
Liu Li (Three Kingdoms) (died 244), Shu Han imperial prince, known as Prince of Liang (梁王) from 221 to 230

Sixteen Kingdoms
Liu He (Han Zhao) (died 310), Former Zhao ruler, known as King of Liang (梁王) after 308
(Some) kings of Former Liang:
Zhang Shi (Former Liang) (reigned 314–320), honored as King of Liang (凉王) posthumously
Zhang Mao (reigned 320–324)
Zhang Jun (prince) (reigned 324–346)
Zhang Chonghua (reigned 346–353)
Zhang Zuo (reigned 353–355)
Zhang Xuanjing (reigned 355–363)
Kings of Southern Liang (Sixteen Kingdoms):
Tufa Wugu (reigned 397–399)
Tufa Lilugu (reigned 399–402)
Tufa Rutan (reigned 402–414)
Kings of Northern Liang:
Duan Ye (reigned 397–401)
Juqu Mengxun (reigned 401–433)
Juqu Mujian (reigned 433–439)
Juqu Wuhui (reigned 442–444)
Juqu Anzhou (reigned 444–460)
Kings of Western Liang (Sixteen Kingdoms):
Li Gao (reigned 400–417)
Li Xin (Western Liang) (reigned 417–420)
Li Xun (Western Liang) (reigned 420–421)
Qifu Gangui (died 412), Western Qin ruler, known as Prince/King of Liang (梁王) from 394 to 395

Liang dynasty and Western Liang
Emperor Wu of Liang (464–549), briefly known as Prince of Liang (梁王) in 502 before he founded the Liang dynasty
Emperor Xuan of Western Liang (519–562), known as Prince of Liang (梁王) from 550 to 555 before he became emperor
Emperor Jing of Liang (543–558), known as Prince of Liang (梁王) briefly in 555 before he became emperor
Xiao Zhuang (548-577?), Liang dynasty emperor who fled to Northern Qi in 560, known as Prince of Liang (梁王) after 570

Sui–Tang transition
Xiao Xian (583–621), warlord who declared himself King of Liang (梁王) in 617
Li Gui (warlord) (died 619), warlord who declared himself King of Liang (凉王) in 617
Shen Faxing (died 620), warlord who declared himself King of Liang (梁王) in 619

Tang dynasty and Five Dynasties
Li Zhong (643–665), Tang dynasty imperial prince, known as Prince of Liang (梁王) after 656
Wu Sansi (died 707), Wu Zetian's nephew, known as Prince of Liang (梁王) from 690 to 705
Zhu Wen (852–912), late Tang dynasty warlord, known as Prince of Liang (梁王) from 903 to 905 before he founded the Later Liang dynasty
Guo Zongxun (953–973), Later Zhou emperor, known as Prince of Liang (梁王) briefly in 959 before he became emperor

Liao dynasty
Emperor Shengzong of Liao (972–1031), known as Prince of Liang (梁王) from 980 to 982 before he became emperor
Emperor Xingzong of Liao (1016–1055), known as Prince of Liang (梁王) from 1018 to 1031 before he became emperor
Emperor Daozong of Liao (1032–1101), known as Prince of Liang (梁王) from 1038 to 1042 before he became emperor
Emperor Tianzuo of Liao (1075–?), known as Prince of Liang (梁王) from 1081 to 1084 before he became emperor

Jin and Yuan dynasties
Wuzhu (died 1148), Jin dynasty imperial prince, posthumously created Prince of Liang (梁王)
Basalawarmi (died 1382), late Yuan dynasty warlord in Yunnan, also known as Prince of Liang (梁王)

Other people
Wang Liang (disambiguation), a list of people with the surname Wang

See also
Liang (disambiguation)